Oxynoemacheilus kurdistanicus is a species of stone loach which is endemic to the Choman River in Iranian Kurdistan. They grow up to 6.9 cm or 2.71 inches in length.  They are vertebrates with soft rays. This type of species are harmless to humans.

Environment 
Oxynoemacheilus kurdistanicus live in freshwater.  They also live in a demersal climate and subtropical range.

References

kurdistanicus
Endemic fauna of Iran
Taxa named by Barzan Bahrami Kamangar
Taxa named by Artem Mikhailovich Prokofiev
Taxa named by Edris Ghaderi
Taxa named by Teodor T. Nalbant
Fish described in 2014